Bendik Hofseth (born 19 October 1962, in Oslo) is a Norwegian jazz musician, who plays the saxophone and sings. He is also a bandleader, and arranges and composes music.

Career 
When Bendik Hofseth went to New York in 1987, and replaced the world-famous saxophonist Michael Brecker in the band Steps Ahead, it probably came as a surprise to many. A youngster from Lørenskog, Norway in the jazz capital of New York, lining up for one of the most renowned jazz bands in US. Along with Steps Ahead, he has toured worldwide several times since 1987.

Hofseth has released seven albums under his own name and has through the years received numerous awards and honors for them. He has also worked as a record producer for among others Jan Eggum and Kenneth Sivertsen. In addition, he has composed numerous commissioned works, film music and founded a chamber music festival in Fredrikstad. He is today a major figure in the Norwegian and international music organizations. He is chairman of NOPA and by-Larm, and the World Composers Organisation, CIAM, where he represents 2.6 million composers and lyricists worldwide. He was for many years chairman of Phonofile. He is also a director of TONO and NCB, to mention a few.

In 1994 Hofseth presented the commission Metamorfoser at Vossajazz. The piece was written for the Norwegian "Rikskonsertene" and was performed on concert tours in 1994. The concert at Rockefeller in Oslo was recorded and the music released in 1995, with Mike Mainieri (vibraphone), Eivind Aarset (guitar), Anders Jormin (double bass), Talvin Singh (tablas) and Jon Christensen (percussion). Hofseth also work as musical instructor and teacher, and is employed by the Agder University College, where he is central to the development of a new course in Music Management. Here he is also responsible for the conference "Challenge of the New".

Discography

As leader
 IX (Columbia, 1991)
 Amuse Yourself (Columbia, 1993)
 Metamorphoses (Sonet/Verve, 1995)
 Planets, Rivers and...Ikea (Verve Forecast, 1996)
 Colours (Sonet/Verve, 1997)
 Ludo (Kirkelig Kulturverksted, 1997)
 Smilets Historie (Sonet, 1999)
 Itaka (Grappa, 2005)
 XI (Grappa, 2009)
 Children & Cosmopolitans (JazzCode, 2015)
 Atonement (C+C, 2018)
 Trunks (C+C, 2020)

As sideman
With Arild Andersen
 Sagn (Kirkelig Kulturverksted, 1990)
 Arv (Kirkelig Kulturverksted, 1994)
 Hyperborean (ECM, 1997)

With Jan Eggum
 Underveis (Grappa, 1991)
 Nesten Ikke Tilstede (Grappa, 1993)
 Kjaerlighet & AErlighet 2 (Grappa, 2011)
 Kjaerlighet & AErlighet 3 (Grappa, 2011)

With Bjorn Eidsvag
 Pa Leit (Kirkelig Kulturverksted, 1984)
 Bjorn's Beste (Kirkelig Kulturverksted, 1985)
 Dansere I Natten (Kirkelig Kulturverksted, 1986)
 Allemannsland (Norsk, 1993)

With Helge Iberg
 Never Ending West Side Story (Kirkelig Kulturverksted, 1997)
 Halvveis (Curling Legs, 2000)
 ReHumaniZing (Aurora, 2007)
 A Musical Offering (Odin, 2017)

With Anne Grete Preus
 Lav Sol! Hoy Himmel (WEA, 1989)
 Millimeter (WEA, 1994)
 Om Igjen for Forste Gang (Warner, 2007)

With Oystein Sevag
 Close Your Eyes and See (Siddhartha Spiritual, 1989)
 Link (Siddhartha Spiritual, 1993)
 Global House (Siddhartha Spiritual, 1994)
 Caravan (Siddhartha Spiritual, 2005)
 The Red Album (Siddhartha Spiritual, 2010)

With others
 Ab und Zu, Ab und Zu (EMI, 1989)
 Maj Britt Andersen, Folk Er Rare! (Barneselskapet, 1986)
 Maj Britt Andersen, Tida Gar Sa Altfor Fort (Barneselskapet, 1987)
 Rebekka Bakken, Is That You? (Boutique/Universal, 2005)
 Jan Bang, Frozen Feelings (CBS, 1989)
 Ragnar Bjerkreim & Edvard Hoem, Oratoriet Kong David (Lynor/Trembling, 2004)
 Christina Bjordal, Brighter Days (Universal, 2006)
 Ketil Bjornstad, Grace (EmArcy, 2001)
 Brother to Brother, Materialize (WEA, 1990)
 Jonas Fjeld, Texas Jensen (Stageway, 1993)
 Christer Fredriksen, Urban Country (Losen, 2011)
 Inger Marie Gundersen, Feels Like Home (Stunt, 2018)
 Ciwan Haco, Bilura Min (Kom Muzik, 1997)
 Ciwan Haco, Derya Ses (Plak, 2003)
 Morten Harket, Wild Seed (Warner Bros., 1995)
 Finn Kalvik, Livets Lyse Side (Carat, 2000)
 Hanne Krogh, Hanne (Sonet, 1989)
 Tony Levin, World Diary Discipline (Global Mobile, 1995)
 Mike Mainieri, Northern Lights (NYC, 2006)
 Andrea Marcelli, Oneness  (Lipstick, 1993)
 Hans Mathisen, Moving Forward (Curling Legs, 2019)
 Silje Nergaard, Nightwatch (Universal/EmArcy, 2003)
 Silje Nergaard, Chain of Days (Okeh, 2015)
 Oslo Gospel Choir, Get Up! (RCA, 1994)
 Lakki Patey, Eventyrland (Honepress, 1985)
 Kjetil Saunes, Fyr (Grappa, 1996)
 Steps Ahead, N.Y.C. (Capitol, Intuition 1989)
 Steps Ahead, Yin-Yang (NYC, 1992)
 Andy Summers, World Gone Strange (Private Music, 1991)
 Pal Thowsen, Sympathy (NorDisc, 1983)
 Jimi Tunnell, Trilateral Commission (101 South, 1992)
 Paolo Vinaccia, Rathkes Gate 12:21:58 (Oslo Session, 2017)
 Jacob Young, This Is You (NORCD, 1995)
 Jacob Young, Glow (Curling Legs, 2001)
 Bertine Zetlitz, Morbid Latenight Show (Parlophone, 1998)

References

External links 

1962 births
Norwegian jazz saxophonists
Norwegian jazz composers
Grappa Music artists
Musicians from Oslo
Living people
21st-century saxophonists
Steps Ahead members
Sonet Records artists
Columbia Records artists